Cysteine protease ATG4A is an enzyme that in humans is encoded by the ATG4A gene.

Autophagy is the process by which endogenous proteins and damaged organelles are destroyed intracellularly. Autophagy is postulated to be essential for cell homeostasis and cell remodelling during differentiation, metamorphosis, non-apoptotic cell death, and aging. Reduced levels of autophagy have been described in some malignant tumors, and a role for autophagy in controlling the unregulated cell growth linked to cancer has been proposed. This gene encodes a member of the autophagin protein family. The encoded protein is also designated as a member of the C-54 family of cysteine proteases. Transcript variants that encode distinct isoforms have been identified.

References

External links

Further reading